The Kune-Vain-Tale Nature Reserve is a nature park located within the Lezhë County forming the Drin river delta and facing the Adriatic Sea in northern Albania. The area is the first protected area to be established in Albania as a hunting reserve in July 1940. The current nature reserve was established in 2010 encompassing the Kunë Island, the Kunë-Vain lagoon, the woodlands, and several ecosystems. Notably, it has been also identified as an Important Bird Area by BirdLife International.

The Kunë-Vain-Tale falls within the Illyrian deciduous forests and Mediterranean woodlands and forests terrestrial ecoregion of the Palearctic temperate broadleaf and mixed forests biome. The climate is typically mediterranean. The nature reserve is characterized by its high vegetation and biodiversity. There are approximately 277 species of plants. The fauna is represented by 341 species; 23 species of mammals, 196 species of birds, 10 species of amphibia, 59 species of insects and 58 species of fish.

See also  
 Protected areas of Albania
 Geography of Albania
 Biodiversity of Albania
 Gulf of Drin

References 

 

Nature parks in Albania
Lagoons of Albania
Geography of Lezhë County
Tourist attractions in Lezhë County
Important Bird Areas of Albania
Tourist attractions in Albania
Protected areas established in 2010
2010 establishments in Albania
Albanian Adriatic Sea Coast